The German Embassy in Washington, D.C. is the Federal Republic of Germany's diplomatic mission to the United States. Its chancery, designed by Egon Eiermann and opened in 1964, is located in northwest Washington, D.C. As of 2018, the German ambassador to the United States is Emily Haber.

History

Early period
Germany and the United States first established diplomatic relations in 1871, the year of the establishment of the German Empire. 

In 1894 the German embassy occupied a new chancery at 1435 Massachusetts Avenue. That building, constructed in 1873 as a private residence on a design by Adolf Cluss, was subsequently expanded to include 70 rooms, and would be occupied by Germany – with wartime interruptions – for nearly 50 years. The opening of the embassy was marked by a formal ball attended by 500 members of the Washington diplomatic corps, along with several members of the United States Congress and Chief Justice of the United States Melville Fuller. Music was provided by a detachment of the United States Marine Band. In this early period the embassy also hosted the return visit of President of the United States Theodore Roosevelt to Prince Henry of Prussia during the prince's official visit to the United States in 1902.

During the years prior to American entry into World War I, Franz von Papen was posted at the embassy as a military attache, though was ultimately declared persona non grata by the U.S. government as a result of suspected espionage. In February 1917 the United States terminated diplomatic relations with Germany. Staff of the embassy were returned their passports by the U.S. government and departed for Germany shortly thereafter.

Following the conclusion of World War I, in 1921, Germany reestablished diplomatic relations with the United States and the German embassy reoccupied its former chancery.

In the spring of 1938 the German government approved plans for construction of a new chancery. Construction, however, was ultimately sidetracked by the war in Europe.

1941 San Francisco incident
A serious diplomatic incident occurred in January 1941 when U.S. Navy sailors Edward Lackey and Harold Sturtevant, both on leave from the psychiatric ward of the Navy's Mare Island Hospital where they had been treated for sleep walking, scaled a fire escape, tore down the flag from the German consulate in San Francisco and destroyed it. According to the sailors, they were unaware the building at which the flag was being flown was the German consulate. In his memoirs, consul Fritz Wiedemann, who witnessed the incident, recalled it as "both surreal and comical". The United States government issued an apology to Germany. The two sailors were briefly jailed and dismissed from military service, though following the onset of war with Germany they were pardoned and allowed to reenlist.

World War II

On December 12, 1941 – following Germany's declaration of war against the United States – Switzerland assumed the role of protecting power of Germany in the United States and took custody of the chancery of the German embassy; staff were, meanwhile, interned at the Greenbrier until an exchange of diplomats was arranged the following year. During World War II, Switzerland used parts of the chancery to house its own staff, thereby alleviating a housing shortage for Swiss diplomatic personnel in the United States. Following the German military surrender in May 1945, Switzerland acknowledged the extinction of the German state and declared itself absolved of protecting responsibilities. The chancery of the embassy was surrendered by Switzerland to the United States government as trustee of the Allied Control Council that month. Upon receiving custody of the building, the United States government removed all documents and files that had been left behind by the German delegation and held them until 1950, at which point they were given to the then newly established West German government.

Post-War

The furnishings of the former German chancery were sold at auction by the U.S. government in 1948, fetching slightly less than $50,000. The chancery was auctioned by the U.S. government in 1951. Morris Cafritz was the high bidder, however, the government subsequently rejected his bid as too low. It was thereafter sold by the U.S. government to James S. Kerwin for $165,000. United States Senator William Langer opposed the sale, saying the site should be held in trust by the U.S. government for the future use of Germany. Four years later, the property was razed and turned into a parking garage.
In 1955 the United States established diplomatic relations with West Germany. The United States awarded the Federal Republic of Germany $300,000 from the earlier sale of the chancery and its furnishings, and a new chancery was occupied in Foxhall that year. The facility was constructed in a modern style and featured modern interior decor as, according to German diplomats at the time, the country "has no antiques now".

East German representation
The German Democratic Republic (GDR) and the United States began full diplomatic relations in 1974. The GDR maintained an embassy in a leased office space on Massachusetts Avenue near Dupont Circle. 

In 1990, the office space was abandoned mid-lease upon the reunification of the Federal Republic of Germany (FRG) and the GDR. Although the FRG agreed to assume all debts and obligations of the former East Germany, the landlord's attorney later wrote that "without disclosing any confidences, I can say that our client did not necessarily find the Federal Republic and its embassy entirely consistent in its public and private positions".

Facilities

Chancery
West Germany, along with Denmark and Switzerland, was a trailblazer in the use of modern architecture for diplomatic facilities in Washington. In 1964 it opened its new and current chancery, designed by Egon Eiermann. The building's design evoked the Bauhaus school and "was meant as a disavowal" of the Nazi architecture of Albert Speer.

The chancery building and consular building underwent a $46.5 million renovation that was completed in 2014.

Residence
The residence is located on the grounds of the chancery. It was constructed in 1994 from a design by O.M. Ungers, who aimed to "find an architectonic expression for the residence of the German ambassador that would be associative of the characteristics" of Germany.

The Washington Post has called the residence "one of the most conspicuous diplomatic pads in town" and, in 2015, described it as "a Bauhaus-inspired take on classical Washington" that did not appear dated, even more than two decades after it was built.

The entrance hall contains two paintings by Gerhard Merz as well as a series of woodcuts on canvas by Markus Lüpertz. The dining room contains paintings by Bernard Schultze and a red lacquered partition/folding screen by Simon Ungers. The ladies' sitting room has an olive green- and brown-colored carpet by Rosemarie Trockel, while the gentlemen's sitting room contains paintings by Christa Näher of the four classical elements.

Consulates 
Germany maintains consulates general in Atlanta, Boston, Chicago, Houston, Los Angeles, Miami, New York, and San Francisco. There are honorary consuls in more than a dozen U.S. cities.

See also
Embassy of the United States, Berlin
United States Ambassador to Germany

Notes

References

External links
 
 

Washington
Germany
Embassy
German-American culture in Washington, D.C.
Embassy
Embassy